Heinisch is a German language surname. It stems from a reduced form of the male given name Heinrich – and may refer to:
Fritz Heinisch (1900–1983),  American football end
Gabriele Heinisch-Hosek (1961), Austrian politician
Ian Heinisch (1988), American mixed martial artist
Karl Heinisch (1847–1923), German painter
Martin Heinisch (1985), Czech professional ice hockey forward

References 

German-language surnames
Surnames from given names